The Bulgaria men's national 3x3 team is the 3x3 basketball team representing Bulgaria in international competitions, organized and run by the Bulgarian Basketball Federation.

Senior Competitions

Performance at World Championships

Performance at European Games

Performance at Europe Championships

Youth Competitions

Performance at Under-18 World Championships

Performance at Under-18 European Championships

See also 
 Bulgaria women's national 3x3 team

References

External links 
Bulgarian Basketball Federation

Basketball
Men's national 3x3 basketball teams
Basketball in Bulgaria